Xcas is a user interface to Giac, which is an open source computer algebra system (CAS) for Windows, macOS and Linux among many other platforms. Xcas is written in C++. Giac can be used directly inside software written in C++.

Xcas has a compatibility modes with many popular algebra systems like WolframAlpha, Mathematica, Maple, or MuPAD. Users can use Giac/Xcas to develop formal algorithms or use it in other software. Giac is used in SageMath for calculus operations. Among other things, Xcas can solve equations (Figure 3) and differential equations (Figure 4) and draw graphs. There is a forum for questions about Xcas.

CmathOOoCAS, an OpenOffice.org plugin which allows formal calculation in Calc spreadsheet and Writer word processing, uses Giac to perform calculations.

Features
Here is a brief overview of what Xcas is able to do:
 Xcas has the ability of a scientific calculator that provides show input and writes pretty print
 Xcas works also as a spreadsheet;
 computer algebra;
 2D geometry in the plane;
 3D geometry in space;
 spreadsheet;
 statistics;
 regression (exponential, linear, logaritmic, logistic, polynomial, power)
 programming;
 solve equations even with complex roots (Figure 2);
 solving trigonometric equations 
 solve differential equations (Figure 3);
 draw graphs;
 calculate differential (or derivative) of functions (Figure 2);
 calculate antiderivative of functions (Figure 2);
 calculate area and integral calculus;
 linear algebra
Example Xcas commands:
 Produce mixed fractions: propfrac(42/15) gives 2 + 
 Calculate square root: sqrt(4) = 2
 Draw a vertical line in coordinate system: line(x=1) draws the vertical line  in the output window
 Draw graph: plot(function) (for example, plot(3 * x^2 - 5) produces a plot of 
 Calculate average: mean([3, 4, 2]) is 3
 Calculate variance: variance([3, 4, 2]) is 
 Calculate standard deviation: stddev([3, 4, 2]) is 
 Calculate determinant of a matrix:  is 
 Calculate local extrema of a function: extrema(-2*cos(x)-cos(x)^2,x) is [0, π]
 Calculate cross product of two vectors: cross([1, 2, 3], [4, 3, 2]) is 
 Calculate permutations: nPr()
 Calculate combinations: nCr()
 Solve equation: solve(equation,x)
 Factoring Polynomials: factor(polynomial,x) or cfactor(polynomial,x)
 Differentiation of function: diff(function,x)
 Calculate indefinite integrals/antiderivatives: int(function,x)
 Calculate definite integrals/area under the curve of a function: int(function,x,lowerlimit,upperlimit)
 Calculate definite integral aka solid of revolution - finding volume by rotation (around the x-axis): int(pi*function^2,x,lowerlimit,upperlimit)
 Calculate definite integral aka solid of revolution - finding volume by rotation (around the y-axis) for a decreasing function: int(2*pi*x*function,x,lowerlimit,upperlimit)
 Separation of variables: split((x+1)*(y-2),[x,y]) produces 
 desolve differential equation (the derivatives are written as y or y): desolve(differential equation,y)

Supported operating systems
 Microsoft Windows
 Apple macOS
 Linux/Unix
 FreeBSD
 Android
 iOS (paid version)
 Online.

History
Xcas and Giac are based on experiences gained with Mr. Parisse's former project Erable.
Pocket CAS and CAS Calc P11 utilize Giac.

The system was also chosen by Hewlett-Packard as the CAS for their HP Prime calculator, which utilizes the Giac/Xcas 1.5.0 engine under a dual-license scheme.

In 2013 the mathematical software Xcas was also integrated into GeoGebra's CAS view.

Use in education 
Since 2015 is Xcas used in the French education system. Xcas is also used in German universities, and also in Spain and Mexico and the University of North Carolina Wilmington as well as the University of New Mexico. Xcas is especially used for learning algebra.

See also

 Comparison of computer algebra systems

References

Further reading
 
 Parisse, Bernard (2007): "Symbolic algebra and Mathematics with Xcas" (list of commands) (PDF). Retrieved 2022-06-08.
 Parisse, B., University of Grenoble (January, 2016) "Giac/Xcas and Pari/GP" (PDF). Retrieved 2022-06-08.
 
 Verlinden, Olivier (2013): "Symbolic generation of the kinematics of multibody systems in EasyDyn: From MuPAD to Xcas/Giac.". Retrieved 2022-06-08.
 http://www.mathsaulycee.sitew.com/fs/premiere_s/8uoow-xcas_commande_utile.pdf (French)
 http://briand-lyc.spip.ac-rouen.fr/IMG/pdf/xcas_fonctions.pdf (French)
 Barnard Parisse: Mathématiques avec Xcas. (French)
Les Maths et Mes Tics (French)
 Fabian Reimers (editor): "Computeralgebra-Rundbrief Nr. 62: Fachgruppe Computeralgebra" (PDF). (German)

External links
 
 Use Xcas online in your web browser

C++ libraries
Computer algebra system software for Linux
Computer algebra system software for macOS
Computer algebra system software for Windows
Free computer algebra systems
Free mathematics software
Free software programmed in C++